David Ellis (born 2 March 1900, date of death unknown) was a Scottish footballer. His regular position was as an outside right. He was born in Glasgow. He played for Airdrieonians, Maidstone United, Manchester United, Bradford City, St Johnstone, and Arthurlie.

References

External links
MUFCInfo.com profile

1900 births
Scottish footballers
Association football outside forwards
Airdrieonians F.C. (1878) players
Maidstone United F.C. (1897) players
Manchester United F.C. players
St Johnstone F.C. players
Ashfield F.C. players
Year of death missing
Bradford City A.F.C. players
Footballers from Glasgow
Scottish Junior Football Association players
Scottish Football League players
English Football League players